= Giacomo Tazzi Biancani =

Giacomo Tazzi Biancani (1729–1789) was an Italian collector, if not archeologist, of ancient antiquities. His manuscripts on Etruscan patera, epigraphy, ancient medals and numismatics were respected by his peers in his native Bologna.

Giacomo was born to an aristocratic family in Bologna. He was a professor of antiquity for the Accademia Fulginentis. Most of his work remained unpublished as manuscripts until his death. He was a member of various scientific societies in Italy. His large library was dispersed after his death. Among his manuscripts are:

- Trattato delle pattere antiche
- De Foliis (1776)
- De cultura morum (1775)
- De aere ad plantarum nutritionem atque accretionem
- Degl'insetti
- De antiquitates studio
- De quibusdam Animalium exeuiis lapidefactis
- Iter per montana quaedam agri bononiensi loca
